Mangalamkunnu Karnan (born 1957–1961 – died 28 January 2021) was an elephant owned by the Mangalamkunnu family (tharavadu), that owns the largest number of captive elephants in Kerala, only behind Guruvayur devaswom. Karnan was known for his ability to raise his head up for a long time, thus able to win in many Thalappokkam (Heads-up) competitions giving him the name Nilavinte Thampuran, which translates into English as Emperor of Heights. Karnan was one of the celebrity elephants in Kerala with a large fan following.

Mangalamkunnu Ganapathy (late), Mangalamkunnu Karnan and Mangalamkunnu Ayyappan are the three most famous elephants in the tharavadu. In 1989, Karnan was repatriated from Chapra in Bihar by the Manissery Haridas group. It was in 2000 that the Mangalamkunnu family bought Karnan. For the ninth year in a row, Karnan won the title for the Thalappokkam competition at the Sreekumara Ganesha Temple. He was also known for winning many Thalappokkam competitions across Kerala. He has acted in some movies and TV commercials. Along with the Malayalam movies Narasimham and Katha Nayagan, Karnan has appeared in the Bollywood movie Dil Se.. Due to age-related issues, Karnan died aged 60 to 63 on 28 January 2021 after suffering a cardiac arrest.

Filmography 
Narasimham
Katha Nayagan
Dil Se..

See also
 List of individual elephants

References

1950s animal births
2021 animal deaths
Individual elephants
Elephants in Indian culture
Individual animals in India
Elephants in Hinduism
Elephants in Kerala